Prunus zippeliana or big leaf cherry (Chinese: 大叶桂樱, Da ye gui ying) is a species of Prunus native to China, Japan, and Vietnam. Individuals have been found in Thailand. It prefers to grow in mixed forests and thickets on calcareous mountains 400 to 2400m above sea level. In a 1994 study, P. zippeliana was found to be the best in the genus Prunus at preventing melanin synthesis. It is an important winter host plant for Asphondylia yushimai, the soybean pod gall midge, which is a major pest of soybeans in Japan.

Description
P. zippeliana is a tree usually about 10 to 25m tall, occasionally reaching 30m. Its dusty gray and green bark has a tendency to flake off in patches, exposing the orange-red underbark, which then changes colors as it weathers, producing quite a dramatic effect in some specimens. Its large leathery leaves are borne on a 1 to 2cm petiole. It flowers July through October and fruits in the winter. Its white flowers are borne on racemes, and are typically 5 to 9mm in diameter. The flowers have 20 to 25 stamens. The fruits are brownish black.

References

zippeliana
Flora of China
Flora of Japan
Flora of Vietnam
Taxa named by Friedrich Anton Wilhelm Miquel